Rev. Dr. Robert Simon Laws, a formerly enslaved person and Howard University graduate, founded two African American Baptist churches in the 19th century that have active congregations in the 21st century.

Early life
Robert Simon Laws was born on Wood Farm Plantation in Middlesex County, Virginia. Laws was enslaved by Sarah “Sally” Roane, the daughter of William Roane and Sarah Daniel. She left her farm and slaves, including Robert, to her niece Polly Roane Segar, according to her 1826 will. At some point Robert was sold to Richard H. Lynch of Washington County, Virginia who published a $100 reward in 1863 for the return of a runaway slave, 24-year-old Robert Laws, who was described as "5 feet 7 inches high and weighs about 175 pounds" and likely headed to Middlesex County, Virginia.

Laws eventually traveled and settled in Washington, DC.  He married Patsey A. Williams in Washington, DC in 1866.

The Old Bell Church, Freedman’s Village

In 1865, the US Congress established Freedmen’s Bureau to administer various camps to house formerly enslaved African Americans, including Freedman’s Village, a site on General Robert E. Lee former estate in Arlington, Virginia. The village comprised approximately 50 story-and-a-half homes, divided in the middle to accommodate two families, an industrial school for education in various trades, a school for children and two places of worship. Harper’s Weekly reported the village also included a hospital, a “home” for the aged, and other public buildings. Abolitionist and women's rights activist Sojourner Truth served as a counselor at the village for over a year.

Robert Laws held various positions at Freedman’s Village including employment agent, teacher and pastor. According to a report made to Congress in 1870, “…Robert S. Laws, a scholar in the Wayland Theological Seminary and who preaches at Arlington, has the supervision of this Freedman’s Village school, which averages about 100 scholars.”  Patsey Laws, his wife, was hired as a nurse for Abbott Hospital in Freedman’s Village.

Two churches were founded in Freedman’s Village in 1866: the Little Zion Methodist Church and Mount Zion Baptist Church. The membership of the Old Bell Church grew and the congregation split into two: Mount Zion Baptist Church and Mount Olive Baptist Church.

Laws was pastor of the Old Bell Church and Mount Zion Baptist Church from 1866 to 1875.  In 1866, he received 90 persons into the church. In 1872, Laws filled the position of Justice of the Peace at Jefferson Township, Alexandria County. However, he was removed from the office in January 1873.

In 1875 the Mount Zion Church building collapsed during repairs. Once new repairs were completed on the church, a new cornerstone was laid on Sunday, October 10, 1875 at a ceremony led by the abolitionist, Rev. William Troy, of Richmond, Virginia and Rev. Laws.

In 2001, Mount Zion Baptist Church hosted a four-night revival meeting celebrating its 135th anniversary. Congregations that grew out of the Old Bell Church were also invited, according to The Washington Post.

Virginia Avenue Baptist Church

Laws graduated from the Preparatory Department at Howard University in 1875.

From 1875-1891, Laws served as pastor of the Virginia Avenue Baptist (Colored) Church, later renamed Friendship Baptist Church.

Laws remained active in the community. In 1883, he also worked for the Washington (DC) Bee newspaper, being in charge of the South Washington office of the paper. Laws was also appointed to a committee for the Freedman's Savings Bank.  By 1886, Laws was a "news editor" at the Washington Bee.

In April 1883, Laws was one of four speakers at the 21st anniversary emancipation celebration in Washington, DC. He reviewed the emancipation parade with the honored guest and speaker Frederick Douglass as well as with Col. Milton M. Holland and Mr. W. Calvin Chase.

Robert and Patsey Laws, according to the 1900 US Census, had one child who was no longer living. A newborn named Robert Laws died November 1884 and was buried in Payne's Cemetery, which was located in the African American community.

Mount Olive Baptist Church
Laws was associated with Mount Olive Baptist Church in Pittsburgh, Pennsylvania as early as August 1901, but was not officially named pastor until November 1901. In June 1902, Laws led about 100 persons in a baptism service at a local river.

On Monday, September 15, 1902 a delegation of African American Baptist pastors left Pittsburgh to attend the National Baptist Convention in Birmingham, Alabama. Between 5,000 and 7,000 delegates from across the country were expected.

On September 20, educators Booker T. Washington of Tuskegee Institute, William Hooper Council, founder of Alabama A&M from Normal, Alabama, and Richard Robert Wright, Sr. of Savannah, Georgia were scheduled to speak at Shiloh Baptist Church, the largest African American church in Birmingham. There was a physical dispute between two individuals after Booker T. Washington's speech. Someone shouted "fight" and the crowd of nearly 2,000 in the church interpreted this as "fire" and scrambled to leave the building. The stampede within Shiloh Baptist Church killed 115 convention attendees.

The Pittsburgh delegation of Black pastors sustained no injuries, though it took two days to confirm that Rev. Robert S. Laws was unharmed.

Death
Robert and Patsey Laws had residence at 708 19th Street, NE in Washington, DC for several years, including 1901 and 1902, according to Washington, DC City Directories. Patsey Laws did not move to Pittsburgh and took in washing to earn money.

Rev. Robert S. Laws died of pneumonia on May 16, 1903, in Pittsburgh. He was buried at Homewood Cemetery in Pittsburgh.

References

External links 
 Mount Zion Baptist Church, Arlington, VA Official Website
 Friendship Baptist Church, Washington, DC Official Website

1903 deaths
African-American Baptist ministers
Baptist ministers from the United States
19th-century American slaves
Baptists from Virginia
Howard University alumni